This is a bibliography of works by Thomas De Quincey (15 August 1785 – 8 December 1859), a romantic English writer. Chiefly remembered today for his Confessions of an English Opium-Eater (1821), De Quincey's oeuvre includes literary criticism, poetry, and a large selection of reviews, translations and journalism. His private correspondence and diary have also been published.

Essays

Translations

Collected works

Miscellania

Notes

Bibliographies by writer
Bibliographies of British writers